New Genetics and Society is a triannual peer-reviewed scientific journal covering sociological perspectives on contemporary genetics and related biological sciences. It was established in 1999 by Peter Glasner and Harry Rothman, with its first issue appearing in April of that year. It is published by Routledge and the editors-in-chief are Richard Tutton (Lancaster University) and Adam Hedgecoe (University of Cardiff). According to the Journal Citation Reports, the journal has a 2017 impact factor of 1.571.

References

External links

Genetics journals
Sociology journals
Routledge academic journals
English-language journals
Triannual journals
Publications established in 1999